Thomas Amory (c. 1691 – 25 November 1788) was a writer with an Irish background. He is thought to have lived in Dublin and later in Westminster.

Polymath
In 1755 Amory published Memoirs containing the lives of several ladies of Great Britain, a History of Antiquities and Observations on the Christian Religion. This was followed by the Life of John Buncle, Esq. in 1766, which was practically a continuation: Vol. I, 1756, and Vol. II,

These works are those of a polymath, covering philology, natural science, theology and other subjects, unsystematically, but with occasional originality and felicity of diction.

Private life
Amory was a keen Unitarian. He was also a renowned eccentric, with a peculiar appearance and the manner of a gentleman. He scarcely ever stirred abroad except at dusk. He died at the age of 97, probably in London.

Notes

The information here is consistent with the entry in The Oxford Companion to English Literature, ed. Sir Paul Harvey, 4th e. (Oxford: Oxford University Press, 1967).

References

1691 births
1788 deaths
18th-century British writers
18th-century Irish writers
18th-century Irish male writers
Writers from Dublin (city)